Sela is a village located in the municipality of Steinkjer in Trøndelag county, Norway. It is located in the rural mountain area in the west-central part of Verran, close to Åfjord municipality. The village is the location of Sela Church.

References

Villages in Trøndelag
Steinkjer